El Manantial  (English: The Spring) is a Mexican telenovela produced by Carla Estrada for Televisa in 2001.

On Monday, October 1, 2001, Canal de las Estrellas started broadcasting El Manantial weekdays at 9:00pm, replacing Sin pecado concebido. The last episode was broadcast on Friday, February 8, 2002 with Entre el amor y el odio replacing it the following Monday.

The series stars Adela Noriega, Daniela Romo, Mauricio Islas and Alejandro Tommasi.

Plot 
In the town of San Andrés, the rivalry between two families —the Valdés and the Ramírez— finds its most obvious channel in "The Spring"

A beautiful spring of water that bathes the small Valdés property and not the neighboring ranch, the rich and prosperous "Piedras Grandes" hacienda, where the best wild cattle in the country are raised, which belongs to the Ramírez family.

However, the real reason for such an intense hatred is hidden in privacy. Justo Ramírez (Alejandro Tommasi), married to Margarita Insunza (Daniela Romo), maintains an adulterous relationship with Francisca Rivero (Azela Robinson), the wife of his rival and neighbor, Rigoberto Valdés (César Évora). This relationship, founded on deceit and promiscuity, will generate the most bitter resentment and will cause the gradual destruction of the two families.

The Valdés have a beautiful daughter named Alfonsina (Adela Noriega), who was born at the same time as Alejandro (Mauricio Islas), the Ramírez's only son and natural heir. Despite having been raised apart from each other and with their souls filled with prejudices against their respective families, they cannot help but feel attracted.

Alfonsina and Alejandro's first meeting is not exactly the best. Accustomed as they are to hating each other's last names, they are convinced of what they have always known: that the Valdés and the Ramírez can only be enemies.

The hatred of Alfonsina's family increases when Justo Ramírez, through a bad move, gets what he has always wanted: to own "The Spring". The loss of the property forces Alfonsina's family to leave San Andrés; hurt, she swears that she will do everything in her power to get back the land that belonged to her grandparents.

Thus, thinking that they have finally got rid of their eternal enemies, the Ramírez decide that the best candidate to be Alejandro's wife is Bárbara Luna (Karyme Lozano), a pretty but calculating and somewhat frivolous girl. Bárbara's family, interested in the advantages that said link will bring them, is delighted with the idea and they formalize the engagement. This coincides with Alfonsina's return to San Andrés.

Bárbara mistrusts the newcomer and tries by all means to get her away from her future husband. However, the force of love is stronger than any intrigue and Alfonsina and Alejandro finally confess their love for each other.

But the resentment and ill will that has marked the relationship between their families condemns them to be victims of bitterness. To survive, their love will have to overcome the barriers that fate presents them, and thus turn "The Spring" into a true source of hope.

Cast 

Adela Noriega as Alfonsina Valdés Rivero
Daniela Romo as Doña Margarita Insunza de Ramírez
Mauricio Islas as Alejandro Ramírez Insunza
Alejandro Tommasi as Don Justo Ramírez
Manuel Ojeda as Father Salvador Valdés
Sylvia Pasquel as Pilar Zaval de Luna
Patricia Navidad as María Magdalena "Malena" Osuna Castañeda
Olivia Bucio as Gertrudis Rivero
Angelina Peláez as Altagracia Herrera de Osuna
Raymudo Capetillo as Dr. Álvaro Luna
Socorro Bonilla as Norma de Morales
Sergio Reynoso as Fermín Aguirre
Justo Martínez as Melesio Osuna
Rafael Mercadente as Gilberto Morales
Gilberto de Anda as Joel Morales
Lorena Enríquez as María Eugenia "Maru" Morales
Alejandro Aragón as Hugo Portillo
Leonor Bonilla as Mirna Barraza de Aguirre
Jorge Poza as Héctor Luna / Héctor Ramírez Rivero
Karyme Lozano as Bárbara Luna Zaval

Recurring and guest stars 
Azela Robinson as Francisca Rivero vda. de Valdés
César Évora as Rigoberto Valdés
Nuria Bages as Martha Eloísa Castañeda vda. de Osuna
Marga López as Mother Superior
Luis Couturier as Carlos Portillo
Julio Monterde as Father Juan Rosario
Teo Tapia as Bishop

Awards and nominations

References

External links

 at esmas.com 
El Manantial at terra.com 
El Manantial at univision.com 
El Manantial at todotnv.com  

2001 telenovelas
Mexican telenovelas
2001 Mexican television series debuts
2002 Mexican television series endings
Spanish-language telenovelas
Television shows set in Mexico City
Televisa telenovelas